An Elephant for Aristotle is a 1958 historical novel by American writer L. Sprague de Camp. It was first published in hardback by Doubleday, and in paperback by Curtis in 1971. The first British edition was published by Dobson in 1966. The book was reissued with a new introduction by Harry Turtledove as a trade paperback and e-book by Phoenix Pick in March 2013. It is the first of de Camp's historical novels in order of writing, and the third chronologically.

Plot summary
The novel concerns the adventures of Leon of Atrax, a Thessalian cavalry commander who has been tasked by Alexander the Great to bring an elephant captured from the Indian ruler Porus, to Athens as a present for Alexander's old tutor, Aristotle. Leading a motley crew that includes an Indian elephantarch to care for the creature, a Persian warrior, a Syrian sutler and a Greek philosopher, Leon sets out to cross the whole of the ancient known world from the Indus River to Athens.

The journey is long and adventurous, involving frequent skirmishes with bandits, unruly noblemen, Macedonian commanders with ideas of their own about who is in charge, and a runaway Persian noblewoman. It doesn't help that the goal of the whole enterprise is essentially a malicious prank concocted by Alexander on his former teacher: he gives Aristotle the elephant but no funds for its upkeep, while sending the funds (but no elephant) to the savant's arch-rival Xenocrates.

The story is founded on the fact that Aristotle's writings include an apparently eye-witness description of an Indian elephant, though the circumstances under which he might have come into contact with such an animal are unknown.

Reception
Contemporary reviews of the novel were favorable. The Chicago Daily Tribune called it "an amazing narrative vehicle for the display of ... a fairly complete composite of the life and times of which the author writes" and praised its "ever-freshly welling vein of humor." The New York Times called it an "engaging new historical novel," and stated that "by hybridizing a Middle-Eastern travelogue with an Alexandrine comedy of manners, the author has produced a specimen only slightly less rare than elephants in Westchester–to wit, a historical novel with a sense of humor." It highlighted de Camp's endowment of each his various characters "with a particular modern accent or dialect" to "differentiate the multitude of nationalities in Alexander's empire," noting that the device "adds to the entertainment." The Washington Post called it an "engaging new novel," and pronounced that "if all books on ancient history were written with the free-flowing grace of An Elephant for Aristotle, many more of us would have an appreciation of the civilizations that came before ours." It stated the author "has given this historical novel a different treatment–one which scrupulously tries to respect historical fact but doesn't take itself too seriously–the change is all for the better."

Awards
The novel won the Athenaeum of Philadelphia's 1958 Athenaeum Literary Award for fiction.

Similar book

The idea of using the travel of an elephant across different countries as the focus of a historical novel was also taken up by the well-known Portuguese writer José Saramago, in the 2008 novel A Viagem do Elefante (The Voyage of the Elephant), though in a very different literary style from de Camp's and set in a very different time (16th Century Europe)  (see ).

Notes

1958 American novels
Novels by L. Sprague de Camp
Books about elephants
Novels set in ancient Persia
Novels set in ancient Greece
Ancient India in popular culture
Doubleday (publisher) books
Novels set in the 4th century BC